Galatasaray SK Wheelchair Basketball 2010–2011 season is the 2010–2011 basketball season for Turkish professional basketball club Galatasaray SK.

The club competes in:
IWBF Champions Cup :Winner
Kitakyushu Champions Cup
Turkish Wheelchair Basketball Super League :Winner

2010-11 roster

Squad changes for the 2010–2011 season

In:

Out:

Results, schedules and standings

Turkish Wheelchair Basketball Super League 2010–11

Pts=Points, Pld=Matches played, W=Matches won, L=Matches lost, F=Points for, A=Points against

Regular season
1st Half

2nd Half

Play-offs
First Half

Second Half

IWBF Champions Cup 2011

Qualifying round
Galatasaray was qualified and İsmail Ar and Matt Scott were selected to the best 5.

Final Group
Final Groups

Semi-Final

FINAL

References

Galatasaray S.K. (wheelchair basketball) seasons
2010–11 in Turkish basketball by club
2011 in wheelchair basketball
2010 in wheelchair basketball